Kronos Argyrades Football Club was a Greek football club, based in Argyrades, Corfu, Greece.

Honours

Domestic Titles and honours

 Gamma Ethniki Champion: 1
 2018–19
 Kerkyra FCA Champion: 3
 1983–84, 2004–05, 2017–18
 Kerkyra FCA Cup Winners: 4
 1977–78, 1987–88, 2006–07, 2015–16
 Kerkyra FCA Super Cup Winners: 3
 2007, 2016, 2018
 Kerkyra FCA Second Division Champion: 3
 1972–73, 1977–78, 2012–13
 Kerkyra FCA Third Division Champion: 1
 1976–77

References

Football clubs in the Ionian Islands (region)
Association football clubs established in 1968
1968 establishments in Greece
Gamma Ethniki clubs